China National Chemical Engineering Co., Ltd. (CNCEC) is a Chinese company in construction engineering and design, ranking 42nd among general contractors worldwide by revenue and 92nd among contractors by revenue from international projects (as of 2011).

The parent company of China National Chemical Engineering Co., Ltd. is China National Chemical Engineering Group Corp.. a state-owned enterprise that is supervised by State-owned Assets Supervision and Administration Commission of the State Council.

Projects
  The company announced in May 2012 a major deal with the UAE government worth $2.95 billion to complete the National House Scheme within a 5-year timeframe.

U.S. investment prohibition 
In August 2020, the United States Department of Defense published the names of companies linked to the People's Liberation Army operating directly or indirectly in the United States. CNCEC was included on the list. In November 2020, Donald Trump issued an executive order prohibiting any American company or individual from owning shares in companies that the United States Department of Defense has listed as having links to the People's Liberation Army, which included CNCEC.

References

External links 

Companies listed on the Shanghai Stock Exchange
Government-owned companies of China
Construction and civil engineering companies of China
Defence companies of China